General elections were held in Tunisia on 3 November 1974 to elect a President and Chamber of Deputies. At the time the country was a one-party state with the Socialist Destourian Party (PSD) as the sole legal party. In the presidential election, Habib Bourguiba was the only candidate by virtue as his role as the chairman of the PSD. In the Chamber election, the PSD put forward a single list of candidates in each constituency. Voter turnout was 96.8% in the Chamber election.

In March 1975, four months after the election, the Chamber of Deputies voted to make Bourguiba president for life. As a result, there were no presidential elections until 1989, after Bourguiba's overthrow.

Results

President

Chamber of Deputies

References

Tunisia
Elections in Tunisia
1974 in Tunisia
Single-candidate elections
One-party elections
Presidential elections in Tunisia
November 1974 events in Africa